The Pulau Sebang/Tampin railway station (formerly Tampin railway station) is a Malaysian train station on the West Coast Line located near and named after the bordering towns of Pulau Sebang, Malacca and Tampin, Negeri Sembilan. The station itself is situated in Malaccan territory, being one of the two stations on the West Coast Line that serves the state of Malacca, the other being Batang Melaka.

The station is served by the KTM ETS, KTM Intercity and KTM Komuter's Seremban Line. The station is the southern terminus of the Seremban Line and the western terminus for Intercity services from JB Sentral.

Location and locality 
This station is located in Pulau Sebang in Alor Gajah district of Melaka, Malaysia and is just a few minutes walk to Tampin town centre in Negeri Sembilan. Tampin and Pulau Sebang itself has been blending their development between these borders that any differences looks hard to be distinguished between the borders originally marked in the town. 

Being a station between the border of two states, near a major town and the terminus of a major commuter line makes the station quite strategic to travellers. Not only it serves both Tampin and Pulau Sebang locality in general, it also attracts passengers as far as central Melaka as there's a bus route of Panorama Melaka bus service that goes from Melaka Sentral to Tampin bus terminal nearby.

Naming dispute
Initially, the station was named "Tampin railway station", despite the station being situated geographically in Pulau Sebang, and not Tampin. There was an unresolved dispute to what the railway station is named as. The people in Negeri Sembilan called the railway station "Tampin railway station" while the people in Malacca called it "Pulau Sebang railway station". KTM also confirmed that the railway station's name is "Tampin" not "Pulau Sebang". Even after a signboard that read "TAMPIN/PULAU SEBANG" was put up on the platforms the dispute was still ongoing. However, on 4 January 2013, KTM resolved the naming dispute by changing the station's name from just Tampin to Pulau Sebang/Tampin.

History
The station began operations on 15 July 1905 when construction of the West Coast Line reached Tampin from Seremban. Later on 1 December 1905, the  Tampin-Malacca Line was opened. The main trunk line to Gemas was only opened about a year later on 1 October 1906. The Tampin-Malacca Line was later dismantled by the Japanese in World War II.

On 10 October 2015, KTM Komuter introduced a new route, a shuttle service between Seremban-Sebang/Tampin-Gemas station. Southbound Komuter passengers (from Kuala Lumpur) will have to alight at Seremban station, and wait for the shuttle train services to Pulau Sebang/Tampin or Gemas. The shuttle service was cut short on 20 June 2016 to Pulau Sebang/Tampin, removing both Batang Melaka and Gemas from the line. This system operated until 11 July 2016, when the Seremban Line was extended to Pulau Sebang/Tampin, effectively replacing the shuttle service with the Komuter line.

The station was the starting point of KTM Intercity's Ekspres Selatan Line, which terminates at Johor Bahru Sentral station before KTM truncates the service to start from Gemas in 2021. The station is also the third last stop of the KTM ETS line, before it terminates at Gemas station.

Services
 KTM ETS
 ETS Gold Train No. 9420/9425 Padang Besar–Gemas
 ETS Premium Train No. 9204/9371 Butterworth–Gemas

References

KTM ETS railway stations
Railway stations opened in 1905
Seremban Line
1905 establishments in British Malaya
Railway stations in Melaka